The Secretary of War was from 1688 the administrative leader of the military in Denmark-Norway. In 1736, it was divided into separate offices for the Army and the Navy and was dissolved as part of Johann Friedrich Struensee's administrative reforms in 1770.

List of office holders

Secretary of War

Secretary of War for the Army

Secretary of War for the Navy

References
Citations

Bibliography
 
 

Denmark–Norway
1688 establishments